Design Flaw is the fifth studio album by Art Bergmann, released on the Other People's Music record label in 1998. The album featured acoustic recordings of songs, primarily from Bergmann's prior albums but also including a new Gram Parsons cover.

Calgary Herald music critic James Muretich named the album as one of the year's best, writing that "one of our best singer-songwriters of the last 20 years brilliantly delves into his repertoire of songs dealing with desire, drugs and dreams."

Bergmann's next release, 2000's Vultura Freeway, comprised unreleased recordings from the early 1980s. He did not release another newly recorded title until 2014's Songs for the Underclass.

Track listing
All songs written by Art Bergmann except where noted.

References

1998 albums
Art Bergmann albums